Tohby Riddle is an Australian artist and writer/illustrator of picture books and illustrated books that have been published in many countries, and translated into many languages, around the world. His work has been translated by Haruki Murakami and he has been nominated for the 2022 Hans Christian Andersen Medal.

Riddle's picture books include The Great Escape from City Zoo, The Royal Guest, Nobody Owns the Moon, My Uncle's Donkey and Unforgotten. Other books include The Greatest Gatsby: a visual book of grammar, the Word Spy books written by Ursula Dubosarsky and illustrated by Riddle, the novel The Lucky Ones, and two cartoon collections, What's the Big Idea? and Pink Freud. The cartoon collections are selected from his work as the weekly cartoonist for Good Weekend magazine (Sydney Morning Herald and Melbourne's Age), a position he held for nearly ten years from 1997–2006.

In 2005 he became editor of The School Magazine, a literary magazine for children founded in 1916, in which his illustrations, non-fiction pieces and poems have also appeared regularly. In 2009 he won the Patricia Wrightson Prize in the New South Wales Premier's Literary Awards with Ursula Dubosarsky for their book The Word Spy.

In 2018, Riddle's book My Uncle's Donkey was translated into a Japanese edition by one of the world's greatest living writers Haruki Murakami after Mr Murakami discovered the book in a Melbourne bookshop on a visit to Australia. This edition was published in December 2018 by Asunaro Shobo.

In December 2020 Riddle was nominated by Australia for the 2022 Hans Christian Andersen Award.

As an artist, Riddle's paintings have continued to gain a following since a sell-out show in 2018. A large solo exhibition, titled Silent Light, is scheduled for January 15–February 27 2022 at the Blue Mountains Cultural Centre, in Katoomba, NSW, Australia.

List of books
Careful With that Ball, Eugene! (1989, US 1991, UK 1991)
A Most Unusual Dog (1992, US 1993)
Arnold Z Jones Could Really Play the Trumpet (1993, reprinted 2000)
The Royal Guest (1993)
50 Fairies You Ought to Know About (1995, Germany 2004)
The Tip at the End of the Street (1996).  IBBY Australia Ena Noel encouragement award for Children's Literature; Children's Book Council of Australia Notable Book 1997
The Great Escape from City Zoo (1997, US 1999). Shortlisted for the Children's Book Council of Australia Picture Book of the Year 1998, and the New South Wales Premier's Literary Awards 1999
The Singing Hat (2000, US 2001). Honour book in the Children's Book Council of Australia Picture Book of the Year awards for 2001; Joint winner of the Wilderness Society of Australia's Environment Award 2001, Picture Books category; Australian Publishers Association Design Awards, 2000, winner of Best Designed Children's Cover; Highly commended in Best Designed Children's Picture Book category; Commended in the Best Designed Jacket of the Year category
What’s the Big Idea? (2003) Highly commended in the Australian Publishers Association Design Awards for 2003, in the Best Designed Illustrated Book category
Irving the Magician (2005) Shortlist, 2006 Picture Book of the Year, Children's Book Council of Australia
The Great Escape from City Zoo (2007, reissue)
Dog and Bird See the Moon (2007)
The Royal Guest (2007, reissue)
Nobody Owns the Moon (2008) Shortlisted, NSW Premier's Literary Awards. Shortlisted, Children's Book Council of Australia Picture Book of the Year awards for 2009
The Word Spy (2008, with Ursula Dubosarsky). Winner, Patricia Wrightson Prize, NSW Premier's Literary Awards, 2009; Honour Book, Eve Pownall Book of the Year 2009, Children's Book Council of Australia Awards
The Lucky Ones (2009)
Return of the Word Spy (2010, with Ursula Dubosarsky). Winner, Eve Pownall Book of the Year 2009, Children's Book Council of Australia Awards
My Uncle's Donkey (2010) Picture Book of the Year 2011, Honour award, Children's Book Council of Australia Awards
Unforgotten (2012) Shortlisted, NSW Premier's Literary awards
The Greatest Gatsby: a visual book of grammar (2015) Shortlisted, NSW Premier's Literary awards; Shortlisted, Prime Minister's Literary Awards; Selected as a White Raven, International Youth Library, Germany
Milo: a moving story (2016)
Here Comes Stinkbug! (2018) Honour Book, Children's Book Council of Australia Awards
Yahoo Creek: an Australian mystery (2019) Shortlisted,  Eve Pownall Book of the Year, Children's Book Council of Australia Awards; Finalist, Best Graphic Novel/Illustrated Work, Aurealis Awards 2019
Nobody Owns the Moon (2019, 10th anniversary reissue)
The Astronaut's Cat (2020) Longlisted, Best Designed Children's Illustrated Book, Australian Book Design Awards 2021
The March of the Ants (2021, with Ursula Dubosarsky)

References

External links

Profile at Penguin Books Australia.

Australian cartoonists
Living people
Australian children's book illustrators
Australian children's writers
20th-century Australian writers
20th-century Australian artists
20th-century Australian male writers
21st-century Australian writers
21st-century Australian artists
21st-century Australian male writers
Year of birth missing (living people)